The M.Zuiko Digital 17 mm f/2.8 is a wide-angle, pancake-style prime lens by Olympus Corporation, for the Micro Four Thirds System.  It is sold in a kit with the Olympus PEN E-P1 camera body and available separately.

The optical scheme has 7 lenses in four groups; two of these lenses are aspherical. Different reviews and tests valued the total optical quality as moderate to good, but far from superior. Still, the compactness and total performance make some good reputation for this kit lens.

This lens is one of the few not billed by Olympus as Movie and Still Compatible ("MSC"), due to noise generated by its focus motor.

External links 
 Official Webpage
 Micro Four Thirds Lenses
 PhotographyBlog review
 SLRGear review

References

Pancake lenses
17mm F2.8
Camera lenses introduced in 2009